Mebroqualone (MBQ) is a quinazolinone-class GABAergic and is an analogue of mecloqualone that has similar sedative and hypnotic properties to its parent compound, resulting from its agonist activity at the β subtype of the GABAa receptor. It was originally synthesized in the 1960s Mebroqualone differs from mecloqualone by having a bromine atom instead of a chlorine on the 3-phenyl ring. It was made illegal in Germany in 1998 but little other information is available.  It would appear that this compound was sold on the black market in Germany as a designer drug analogue of mecloqualone.

See also 
 Methaqualone
 Afloqualone
 Etaqualone
 Methylmethaqualone
 Mecloqualone
 Cloroqualone
 Diproqualone
 Gamma-Aminobutyric acid

References 

Sedatives
Bromoarenes
Quinazolinones
GABAA receptor positive allosteric modulators
Designer drugs